Tetley's Bitter Super League was the official name for the year 2000's Super League championship season, the 106th season of top-level professional rugby league football in Britain, and the fifth championship run by the Super League. The season culminated in the Grand Final between St Helens R.F.C. and Wigan Warriors, which St Helens won, claiming their second consecutive Championship.

Table

Play-offs

Wide to West
St Helens, who finished second in the regular season table, hosted Bradford Bulls for the qualifying play-off in week one of the play-offs. One of Super League's most well known tries was scored in the final seconds of the match. Bradford led the game 11–10 into the final minute when, deep in the St Helens half with the match seemingly lost, St Helens were awarded a penalty. The try scored on the second tackle by Chris Joynt became known as "Wide to West" due to the phrase being used in live commentary by Eddie Hemmings. St Helens won 16–11.

Eddie Hemmings and Mike Stephenson commentated for  Sky Sports:
 
Hemmings   It's gonna be the match for Bradford.
Stephenson He's given a penalty.
Hemmings   Oh, he has.
Stephenson He'd called held there. They're still not out of it. Oh, they've taken a short one, they know they've only got ten seconds. Will they get this play-the-ball in? They're holding him down.
Crowd [counting down until the end of match] 5, 4, 3, 2, 1
Hemmings Sculthorpe wants to get on with it, Bradford: counting down.
Stephenson Kick and chase now?
Hemmings This is the last play. Long... kicks it wide to Iro. Iro to Hall. Hall is trapped. Back it goes to Hoppe. Over the shoulder to Hall. There is Jonkers. Here is Long, and Long fancies it. Long fancies it. It's wide to West. It's wide to West. Dwayne West. Inside to Joynt. Joynt. JOYNT. JOYNT! OH! OH! FANTASTIC!
Stephenson I wouldn't believe it!
Hemmings They've won it, they've won it, they've won it. Chris Joynt; Chris Joynt has won it. It is unbelievable here, it is, frankly, unbelievable. Chris Joynt has won the match for St Helens.

See also
2000 Super League Grand Final
2000 Challenge Cup

References

External links
Super League V at wigan.rlfans.com
Super League V at rugbyleagueproject.com